Two ships of the Royal Navy have been named Veronica:

 , an  sloop
 , a 

Royal Navy ship names